Investopedia is a financial media website headquartered in New York City, U.S.A. Founded in 1999, Investopedia provides investment dictionaries, advice, reviews, ratings, and comparisons of financial products such as securities accounts. Investopedia has more than 32,000 articles and reaches 44 million unique monthly viewers and posts paid advertisements as investing information. It is part of the Dotdash Meredith family of brands owned by IAC.

Investopedia offers educational technology into day trading, asset management, foreign exchange markets, as well as financial educational courses. It also hosts a stock market simulator. Self-paced, online courses from expert instructors are available on Investopedia Academy.

History

Founding and early history 
Investopedia was founded in 1999 by Cory Wagner and Cory Janssen in Edmonton, Alberta. At the time, Janssen was a business student at the University of Alberta. Wagner focused on business development and research and development, while Janssen focused on marketing and sales.

2000s 
In April 2007, Forbes Media acquired Investopedia.com for an undisclosed amount. At the time of the acquisition, Investopedia drew about 2,500,000 monthly users and provided a financial dictionary with about 5,000 terms from personal finance, banking and accounting. It also provided articles by financial advisers and a stock market simulator.

2010s 
In August 2010, Forbes sold Investopedia to ValueClick for $42 million. By then, the site had grown to more than 30,000 pieces of content and reached 2.2 million unique visitors per month. In 2013, ValueClick would then sell Investopedia and a group of other properties to IAC for $80 million. Following the acquisition by IAC, Investopedia launched several initiatives, including Investopedia Academy to sell educational technology.

In March 2015, David Siegel, an alum of Seeking Alpha, was hired as CEO of Investopedia. Caleb Silver was hired from CNN to oversee content operations for the platform in January 2016. Investopedia's list of the most "influential" financial advisers in the United States was launched in June 2017.

In July 2018, Investopedia joined the Dotdash family of brands and laid off 1/3 of its staff, or 36 people. The site underwent a rebranding and relaunch later in the year. In early 2019, the site announced the winners of its inaugural online broker and robo-advisor awards.

2020s 
In 2020, editor-in-chief Silver described Investopedia's goal as "provid[ing] context around the news," rather than breaking new stories. The site launched its first podcast, The Investopedia Express, hosted by Silver, in September 2020. 

Silver also frequently appears as a guest financial expert on a variety of broadcast and radio programs, including MSNBC, ABC News and NBC.

References

External links

 

1999 establishments in Canada
Finance websites
Financial services companies established in 1999
IAC (company)
Internet properties established in 1999
Online financial services companies of the United States
Companies based in New York City